WSEV-FM (105.5 FM, "Mix 105.5") operates as Sevier County's only local FM radio station.  While other stations are licensed to Sevierville, their studios are based in Knoxville, Tennessee.

History
WSEV-FM was originally licensed to Gatlinburg, Tennessee, as a sister to WSEV, although the studios for both stations were located in Sevierville, Tennessee. In 1990 the station was purchased, along with its AM sister station WSEV/930, by the Dollywood Broadcasting Company, a privately owned corporation whose owners included Dolly Parton; Orr & Earls Broadcasting, Inc., of Branson, Missouri; and other investors. Orr & Earls Broadcasting, Inc. was selected as the managing partner due to their success in managing Branson-area radio stations KRZK and KOMC. WSEV-FM's call letters were changed to WDLY to reflect the connection with Parton, and the design of the call letters incorporated the Dollywood theme park's butterfly logo. Its format was changed to country music. The station's slogans was "This Is Dolly's Station! 105.5 WDLY", "The Best Music! Dolly's Station! WDLY", and "Dolly's 105.5 WDLY". However, WDLY had a tough time competing against Knoxville's WIVK-FM and WOKI during the years they had a country format. After ten years as WDLY, the station was sold to East Tennessee Radio Group and the call sign reverted to WSEV-FM in May 2000. Its studios were moved from Middle Creek Road in Sevierville to Dumplin Valley Road in Kodak, Tennessee.

External links

SEV-FM
Hot adult contemporary radio stations in the United States
Radio stations established in 1983
Sevier County, Tennessee